Kalb Kandi (also Romanized as Kalb Kandī) is a village in Nazarkahrizi Rural District, Nazarkahrizi District, Hashtrud County, East Azerbaijan Province, Iran. At the 2006 census, its population was 128, in 29 families.

References 

Towns and villages in Hashtrud County